Rustai-ye Shahid Deh Qan Pur (also romanized as Rūstāī-ye Shahīd Deh Qān Pūr) is a village in Jahadabad Rural District, in the Central District of Anbarabad County, Kerman Province, Iran. At the 2006 census, its population was 575, in 118 families.

References 

Populated places in Anbarabad County